Kristiyan Kitov (Bulgarian: Кристиян Китов; born 14 October 1996) is a Bulgarian footballer who plays as a midfielder for Strumska Slava Radomir. He is the youngest debutant and goalscorer for Ludogorets.

Career

Ludogorets Razgrad
Born in Sofia, Kitov began his football career from CSKA Sofia, before moving to Ludogorets Razgrad. He was the captain of the U19 team who took a part of 2014–15 season of UEFA Youth League.

Kitov become the youngest player to debut for the first team, coming in play at 15 years 11 months 25 days in match against Dunav Ruse in the Bulgarian Cup. He completed his professional debut in A Group on 18 May 2014 scoring a goal for the 3:1 win over Cherno More, becoming the youngest goalscorer for Ludogorets at age 16 years 7 months 4 days. For the 2015–16 season Kitov was part of the newly created second team of Ludogorets in B Group playing not very often due to injuries. Three years later, on 28 May 2017, he returned in the first team and played for the  First League again against Cherno More and the team won with the same result.

Kitov started the 2017–18 season in Ludogorets II playing in the first match of the season against Lokomotiv 1929 Sofia.

On 30 May 2018 Kitov ended his contract with Ludogorets due to mutual agreement, because he couldn't find a place in the first team and the team didn't want to stop his development.

Lokomotiv GO
On 7 July 2018 Kitov signed a contract with the Bulgarian Second League team Lokomotiv GO.

Career statistics

Club

Honours

Club 
Ludogorets
 Bulgarian A Group: 2013–14
 Bulgarian Cup: 2013–14

References

External links

Profile at ludogoretsvarna.com

1996 births
Living people
Bulgarian footballers
First Professional Football League (Bulgaria) players
Second Professional Football League (Bulgaria) players
PFC Ludogorets Razgrad II players
PFC Ludogorets Razgrad players
FC Lokomotiv Gorna Oryahovitsa players
FC Strumska Slava Radomir players
Association football midfielders